Prof. Kulikoyela Kanalwanda Kahigi (born 4 August 1950) is a Tanzanian CHADEMA politician and was a Member of Parliament for Bukombe constituency during 2010 - 2015. He is now back at the University of Dar es Salaam, teaching Linguistics in the Institute of Kiswahili Studies.

References

1950 births
Living people
Chadema MPs
Tanzanian MPs 2010–2015
Mkwawa Secondary School alumni
University of Dar es Salaam alumni
Michigan State University alumni